= Penugolakala =

- village
- Interactive map of Penugolakala
- Location in Andhra Pradesh, India Penugolakala (India)
- Coordinates: 13.32058°N 78.79905°E
- Country: India
- State: Andhra Pradesh
- District: Chittoor

Languages
  - Official: Telugu
- Time zone: UTC+5:30 (IST)
- Vehicle registration: AP-
- Coastline: 0 kilometres (0 mi)

Penugolakala is a hamlet in Peddakappali gram panchayat in Pedda Panjani mandal, Chittoor district, Andhra Pradesh.
