= Peddapanjani =

- village
- Nickname: panjani sathram
- Interactive map of Peddapanjani
- Location in Andhra Pradesh, India Peddapanjani (India)
- Coordinates: 13°17′41″N 78°41′18″E
- Country: India
- State: Andhra Pradesh
- District: Chittoor
- Mandal: Peddapanjani.
- Founder: B Narendra
- chillapalle: Muthukur

Government
  - Type: SARPANCH

Languages
  - Official: Telugu
- Time zone: UTC+5:30 (IST)
- PIN: 517247
- Vehicle registration: AP

Peddapanjani also called panjani sathram is a village in Chittoor district of the Indian state of Andhra Pradesh. it is also native mandal of tdp minister sri N. Amaranadha reddy.It is the mandal headquarters of Peddapanjani mandal.
